New Jersey to Woodstock is a compilation album by American singer Kathy McCord, released in 2010. It contains the album Kathy McCord released on CTI Records in 1970, the single "I'll Give My Heart To You"/"I'll Never Be Alone Again" released on Rainy Day Records in 1968, as well as 16 previously unreleased songs, recorded by the artist in 1972–1979. The album was reproduced under the label Big Beat Records. McCord's signature mix of soul, folk rock, and psychedelic rock is on full display in this compilation.

Track listing

Personnel

CD 1 (tracks 1-10) 
Kathy McCord – vocals
Hubert Laws – flute
Paul Harris – piano, organ
John Hall – guitar
Harvey Brooks – bass
Willis Kelly – drums
Ed Shaughnessy – drums, tabla
Don Sebesky – string and brass arrangements

Release history

References 

2010 compilation albums
Kathy McCord albums